Boggestranda is a village in Molde Municipality in Møre og Romsdal county, Norway. There are some very old rock carvings in Boggestranda.

References

External links
Boggestranda i kortversjon 

Molde
Villages in Møre og Romsdal